Acianthera brachiloba is a species of orchid plant native to Brazil.

References 

brachiloba
Flora of Brazil
Plants described in 1929